The 2019 Northwestern State Demons baseball team represented Northwestern State University in the 2019 NCAA Division I baseball season. The Demons played their home games at H. Alvin Brown–C. C. Stroud Field.

Roster

Coaching staff

Schedule

! style="" | Regular Season
|- valign="top" 

|- bgcolor="#ffcccc"
| 1 || February 15 || at Houston || Schroeder Park • Houston, TX || L 3–5 || 0–1 ||
|- bgcolor="#ffcccc"
| 2 || February 16 || at Houston || Schroeder Park • Houston, TX || L 4–5 || 0–2 ||
|- bgcolor="#ccffcc"
| 3 || February 17 || at Houston || Schroeder Park • Houston, TX || W 2-1 || 1–2 || 
|- bgcolor="#ccffcc"
| 4 || February 24 || Southern || H. Alvin Brown–C. C. Stroud Field • Natchitoches, LA || W 13–6 || 2–2 ||
|- bgcolor="#ffcccc"
| 5 || February 24 || Southern || H. Alvin Brown-C. C. Stroud Field • Natchitoches, LA || L 5–7 || 2–3 ||
|- bgcolor="#ccffcc"
| 6 || February 26 || Louisiana-Monroe || H. Alvin Brown-C. C. Stroud Field • Natchitoches, LA || W 15–0 || 3–3 ||
|-

|- bgcolor="#ccffcc"
| 7 || March 1 ||  Little Rock || H. Alvin Brown-C. C. Stroud Field • Natchitoches, LA || W 1–0 || 4–3 ||
|- bgcolor="#ffcccc"
| 8 || March 2 || Little Rock || H. Alvin Brown-C. C. Stroud Field • Natchitoches, LA || L 5–7 || 4–4 ||
|- bgcolor="#ccffcc"
| 9 || March 2 || Little Rock || H. Alvin Brown-C. C. Stroud Field • Natchitoches, LA || W 7–5 || 5–4 ||
|- bgcolor="#ccffcc"
| 10 || March 5 || at Louisiana Tech || J. C. Love Field at Pat Patterson Park • Ruston, LA || W 8–4 || 6–4 ||
|- bgcolor="#ffcccc"
| 11 || March 8 || at Abilene Christian || Crutcher Scott Field • Abilene, TX || L 0–4 || 6–5 || 0–1
|- bgcolor="#ccffcc"
| 12 || March 9 || at Abilene Christian || Crutcher Scott Field • Abilene, TX || W 24–11 || 7–5 || 1–1
|- bgcolor="#ffcccc"
| 13 || March 10 || at Abilene Christian || Crutcher Scott Field • Abilene, TX || L 2–6 || 7–6 || 1–2
|- bgcolor="#ccffcc"
| 14 || March 12 || #11 LSU || H. Alvin Brown-C. C. Stroud Field • Natchitoches, LA || W 3-1 || 8–6 ||
|- bgcolor="#ccffcc"
| 15 || March 15 || New Orleans || H. Alvin Brown-C. C. Stroud Field • Natchitoches, LA || W 4-3 || 9–6 || 2–2
|- bgcolor="#ffcccc"
| 16 || March 16 || New Orleans || H. Alvin Brown-C. C. Stroud Field • Natchitoches, LA || L 2-5 || 9–7 || 2–3
|- bgcolor="#ccffcc"
| 17 || March 17 || New Orleans || H. Alvin Brown-C. C. Stroud Field • Natchitoches, LA || W 8-1 || 10–7 || 3-3
|- bgcolor="#ffcccc"
| 18 || March 19 || at Louisiana || M. L. Tigue Moore Field at Russo Park • Lafayette, LA || L 3-8 || 10–8 ||
|- bgcolor="#ffcccc"
| 19 || March 22 || Lamar Cardinals || H. Alvin Brown-C. C. Stroud Field • Natchitoches, LA || L 3–4 || 10–9 || 3–4
|- bgcolor="#ccffcc"
| 20 || March 23 || Lamar || H. Alvin Brown-C. C. Stroud Field • Natchitoches, LA || W 5–2 || 11–9 || 4–4
|- bgcolor="#ccffcc"
| 21 || March 24 || Lamar || H. Alvin Brown-C. C. Stroud Field • Natchitoches, LA || W 10–6 || 12–9 || 5–4
|- bgcolor="#ccffcc"
| 22 || March 27 || at Southern || Lee–Hines Field • Baton Rouge, LA || W 6–3 || 13–9 ||
|- bgcolor="#ffcccc"
| 23 || March 29 || at Houston Baptist || Husky Field • Houston, TX || L 2–10 || 13–10 || 5–5
|- bgcolor="#ffcccc"
| 24 || March 30 || at Houston Baptist || Husky Field • Houston, TX || L 2–12 || 13–11 || 5–6
|- bgcolor="#ccffcc"
| 25 || March 31 || at Houston Baptist || Husky Field • Houston, TX || W 7–5 || 14–11 || 6–6
|-

|- bgcolor="#ccffcc"
| 28 || April 2 || Mississippi Valley State || H. Alvin Brown-C. C. Stroud Field • Natchitoches, LA || W 11–0 || 15–11 ||
|- bgcolor="#ccffcc"
| 29 || April 3 || Mississippi Valley State || H. Alvin Brown-C. C. Stroud Field • Natchitoches, LA || W 9-0 || 16–11 ||
|- bgcolor="#ccffcc"
| 30 || April 5 || Nicholls || H. Alvin Brown-C. C. Stroud Field • Natchitoches, LA || W 7–1 || 17–11 || 7–6
|- bgcolor="#ccffcc"
| 31 || April 6 || Nicholls || H. Alvin Brown-C. C. Stroud Field • Natchitoches, LA || W 9–7 || 18–11 || 8–6
|- bgcolor="#ccffcc"
| 32 || April 7 || Nicholls || H. Alvin Brown-C. C. Stroud Field • Natchitoches, LA || W 3–2 || 19–11 || 9–6
|- bgcolor="#ffcccc"
| 33 || April 10 || at Louisiana-Monroe || Warhawk Field • Monroe, LA || L 4–8 || 19–12 ||
|- bgcolor="#ffcccc"
| 34 || April 12 || at Southeastern Louisiana || Pat Kenelly Diamond at Alumni Field • Hammond, LA || L 3–5 || 19–13 || 9–7
|- bgcolor="#ffcccc"
| 35 || April 13 || at Southeastern Louisiana || Pat Kenelly Diamond at Alumni Field • Hammond, LA || L 1–8 || 19–14 || 9–8
|- bgcolor="#ccffcc"
| 36 || April 14 || at Southeastern Louisiana || Pat Kenelly Diamond at Alumni Field • Hammond, LA || W 3–1 || 20–14 || 10–8
|- bgcolor="#ccffcc"
| 37 || April 17 || LSU-Shreveport || H. Alvin Brown-C. C. Stroud Field • Natchitoches, LA || W 6–3 || 21–14 ||
|- bgcolor="#ffcccc"
| 38 || April 19 || McNeese State || H. Alvin Brown-C. C. Stroud Field • Natchitoches, LA || L 4-7 || 21–15 || 10–9
|- bgcolor="#ccffcc"
| 39 || April 20 || McNeese State || H. Alvin Brown-C. C. Stroud Field • Natchitoches, LA || W 6–0 || 22–15 || 11–9
|- bgcolor="#ccffcc"
| 40 || April 20 || McNeese State || H. Alvin Brown-C. C. Stroud Field • Natchitoches, LA || W 6–5 || 23–15 || 12-9
|- bgcolor="#ffcccc"
| 41 || April 23 || at #6 Arkansas || Baum–Walker Stadium • Fayetteville, AR || L 2–19 || 23–16 || 
|- bgcolor="#ccffcc"
| 42 || April 24 || at #6 Arkansas || Baum-Walker Stadium • Fayetteville, AR || W 10–7 || 24–16 ||
|- bgcolor="#ffcccc"
| 43 || April 26 || at Stephen F. Austin || Jaycees Field • Nacogdoches, TX || L 2–4 || 24–17 || 12–10
|- bgcolor="#ccffcc"
| 44 || April 27 || at Stephen F. Austin || Jaycees Field • Nacogdoches, TX || W 7–0 || 25–17 || 13–10
|- bgcolor="#ffcccc"
| 44 || April 28 || at Stephen F. Austin || Jaycees Field • Nacogdoches, TX || L 3–5 || 25–18 || 13–11
|- bgcolor="#ccffcc"
| 44 || April 30 || Louisiana Tech || H. Alvin Brown-C. C. Stroud Field • Natchitoches, LA || W 3–1 || 26–18 ||
|-

|- bgcolor="#ffcccc"
| 45 || May 3 || Grambling State || H. Alvin Brown-C. C. Stroud Field • Natchitoches, LA || L 6–7 || 26–19 || 13–12
|- bgcolor="#ccffcc"
| 46 || May 5 || Grambling State || H. Alvin Brown-C. C. Stroud Field • Natchitoches, LA || W 11-2 || 27–19 || 14–12
|- bgcolor="#ccffcc"
| 47 || May 5 || Grambling State || H. Alvin Brown-C. C. Stroud Field • Natchitoches, LA || W 5–4 || 28–19 || 15–12
|- bgcolor="#ccffcc"
| 48 || May 10 || Incarnate Word || H. Alvin Brown-C. C. Stroud Field • Natchitoches, LA || W 7–6 || 29–19 || 16–12
|- bgcolor="#ffcccc"
| 49 || May 12 || Incarnate Word || H. Alvin Brown-C. C. Stroud Field • Natchitoches, LA || L 5–6 || 29–20 || 16–13
|- bgcolor="#ffcccc"
| 50 || May 12 || Incarnate Word || H. Alvin Brown-C. C. Stroud Field • Natchitoches, LA || L 9–12 || 29–21 || 16–14
|- bgcolor="#ffffff"
| 51 || May 14 || at Louisiana-Monroe || Warhawk Field • Monroe, LA || colspan=4 |Game cancelled due to heavy rains in Monroe.
|- bgcolor="#ffcccc"
| 52 || May 16 || at Sam Houston State || Don Sanders Stadium • Huntsville, TX || L 5–11 || 29–22 || 16–15
|- bgcolor="#ccffcc"
| 53 || May 17 || at Sam Houston State || Don Sanders Stadium • Huntsville, TX || W 9–4 || 30–22 || 17–15
|- bgcolor="#ffcccc"
| 54 || May 17 || at Sam Houston State || Don Sanders Stadium • Huntsville, TX || L 4–5 || 30–23 || 17–16
|-

|-
! style="" | Post-Season
|- valign="top" 

|- bgcolor="#ffcccc"
| 55 || May 22 || vs. (2) Central Arkansas || Constellation Field • Sugar Land, TX || L 0–2 || 30–24 ||
|- bgcolor="#ffcccc"
| 56 || May 23 || vs. (3) Southeastern Louisiana || Constellation Field • Sugar Land, TX || L 4-6 || 30-25 ||
|-

|-
|

References

Northwestern State Demons
Northwestern State Demons baseball seasons
Northwestern State baseball